US Diamantinoise is a football club of Martinique, based in the southwestern town Le Diamant.

They play in Martinique's first division, the Martinique Championnat National.

External links
 Club info – French Football Federation

References

Diamantinoise